Trouble-Maker is a Canadian drama film, directed by Pierre Patry and released in 1964.

The film stars Lucien Hamelin as Lucien, a student at a religious school who begins to rebel against the strict moral order of the Roman Catholic priests.

It was made over 25 days on a shoestring budget, and adapted some aspects of the direct cinema style of filmmaking. The film is typically analyzed by critics as an allegory for the Quiet Revolution, although its criticism of the Catholic church saw Patry threatened with excommunication.

The film was a Canadian Film Award finalist for Best Motion Picture in 1964.

References

External links
 

1964 films
Canadian drama films
Quebec films
French-language Canadian films
1960s Canadian films
1964 drama films